(released as Genji: Dawn of the Samurai in the US) is a 2005 PlayStation 2 game, developed by Game Republic and published by Sony Computer Entertainment. It is loosely based on The Tale of the Heike. A sequel, Genji: Days of the Blade, was released for PlayStation 3.

Plot
The story follows the adventures of Minamoto Yoshitsune as he descends from his mountain retreat and eventually embraces a quest to defeat the Taira clan, thereby avenging his father. Early in his journey, he meets the Tamayoribito clan, led by Kiichi Hogen and his daughter Minazuru, who are the guardians of the Amahagane (天鋼) – stones of power that allow select individuals to release magical powers known as kamui (神威).

Gameplay
Gameplay is third-person combat, similar to what is found in the Dynasty Warriors series (produced by Koei) and Shinobi 2 (produced by Sega). The player controls Yoshitsune or Benkei, and both characters are equipped with two basic attacks: Normal and Special. Yoshitsune is an archetypical fast and agile warrior, making up in speed what he lacks in strength. He is able to jump on small platforms (which, if jumped on by Benkei, would collapse). He wields two swords, and can double jump, and can use his sword to hang on ledges. Benkei is the more powerful but slower character, with greater range than Yoshitsune. He uses a large war club, which can also be used to destroy certain structures and heavy doors in the game. Players can improve their characters by collecting experience and leveling up or by using Essences of Amahagane. Yoshitsune and Benkei both have a number of kamui bars under their health bar, proportional to their amount of Amahagane collected. While in battle, the character's kamui bar stores power for the player to release devastating attacks.

Reception

The game received "average" reviews according to video game review aggregator Metacritic.  In Japan, Famitsu gave it all four eights, for a total of 32 out of 40.

References

External links
Game Republic page
Sony Computer Entertaiment Inc. page

2005 video games
Action-adventure games
Cultural depictions of Minamoto no Yoshitsune
Game Republic games
Hack and slash games
PlayStation 2 games
PlayStation 2-only games
Sony Interactive Entertainment games
Video games about samurai
Video games developed in Japan
Video games set in feudal Japan
Video games scored by Yasuharu Takanashi
Single-player video games